Centrolepis aristata, commonly known as pointed centrolepis, is a species of plant in the Restionaceae family and is found in areas of southern Australia.

Description
It is a bright green colour becoming reddish after it flowers.
It flowers between August and December. Between 6-22 flowers form in a terminal cluster, the flowers have a brown to yellowish colour. Brown ovoid fruit follow that contain small soft seeds.

Classification
The species was first formally described by the botanist Robert Brown and then by Johann Jacob Roemer and Josef August Schultes in 1817 in the work Systema Vegetabilium.

Distribution
It is found among rocky outcrops and in winter wet depressions in the Mid West, Wheatbelt, South West, Great Southern and Goldfields-Esperance regions of Western Australia where it grows in damp sandy-clay-loam soils over granite. In South Australia it is found along much of the south coast, all of the Eyre Peninsula and Yorke Peninsula, through all of the south east and as far north as the Flinders Ranges. The plant is also found in 
New South Wales, Victoria and Tasmania.

References

aristata
Plants described in 1817
Flora of Western Australia
Flora of South Australia
Flora of Victoria (Australia)
Flora of Tasmania
Flora of New South Wales
Poales of Australia